The Liberty Hyde Bailey Birthplace, now the Liberty Hyde Bailey Museum, is a farmhouse located at 903 Bailey Avenue in South Haven, Michigan, and is significant as the birthplace and childhood home of horticulturist Liberty Hyde Bailey.  It was designated a Michigan State Historic Site in 1963 and listed on the National Register of Historic Places in 1983.

History
This farmhouse was built in 1853-1858 by Liberty Hyde Bailey Sr., and stood on his 80-acre farm.  In 1858, Liberty Hyde Bailey was born in this house; the younger Bailey spent 19 years living here, learning about the local wild animals and plants.  He entered Michigan Agricultural College (now Michigan State University) in 1878, and went on to become a well-known horticulturist, botanist and cofounder of the American Society for Horticultural Science.

In 1918, Frank E. Warner purchased the Bailey farm, and lived there until his death in 1926. In 1937, the property which the house stands on was presented to the city of South Haven for use as a memorial to Dr. Bailey.

Description
The Liberty Hyde Bailey Birthplace is a -story Greek Revival house clad in clapboard and sitting on a fieldstone foundation.  A single-story rear section was added some time after the original construction.  The interior has plaster walls and ceilings with plain board trim.  The first floor contains sitting and dining rooms, a kitchen, a bedroom, and a storage room.  The second floor contains three bedrooms and a small library.

References

External links

Liberty Hyde Bailey Museum

Houses on the National Register of Historic Places in Michigan
Greek Revival houses in Michigan
Houses completed in 1853
LIberty Hyde Bailey Museum
Michigan State Historic Sites
Historic house museums in Michigan
Biographical museums in Michigan
Houses in Van Buren County, Michigan
1853 establishments in Michigan
Birthplaces of individual people
National Register of Historic Places in Van Buren County, Michigan